The Common Module Family (CMF) is a modular architecture concept jointly developed by car manufacturers Nissan and Renault through their Renault–Nissan–Mitsubishi Alliance partnership. The concept covers a wide range of vehicle platforms.

Main features
CMF is aimed at reducing manufacturing costs and competing with similar previous concepts as Volkswagen Group's MQB. It consists of five groups of interchangeable, compatible modules: engine bay, cockpit, front underbody, rear underbody and electrical/electronic. According to the companies involved in the development, CMF is not a conventional platform but rather a manufacturing system which can be applied to different vehicles. The actual platforms are built combining a limited set of common modules: a single module can be used for different platforms, covering different classes of vehicles, and so allowing a greater standardisation of components between both Nissan, Renault and Mitsubishi.

Applications 
The Renault–Nissan Alliance announced various variants developed using CMF, which are CMF-C (D for large and mid-sized vehicles; examples are the third-generation Nissan X-Trail and the second-generation Nissan Qashqai), CMF-B for subcompacts/supermini, CMF-A for smaller vehicles, and CMF-EV for alliance wide BEV. The CMF will initially be used in approximately 14 vehicle models worldwide with an estimated production of 1.6 million units annually. The first CMF vehicles were introduced through 2013 with Nissan's CMF-C/D models.

CMF-A
The CMF-A platform underpins various vehicles in the A-segment or city car segment. The first CMF-A car, the Renault Kwid, was launched into the Indian market in September 2015. The platform currently also supports electric powertrain, for the Renault City K-ZE and its rebadged models.

Vehicles using platform (calendar years):
 Renault Kwid (2015–present)
 Datsun redi-GO (2016–2022)

CMFA-EV 
The CMFA-EV is the name used for the CMF-A platform that is adapted for battery electric vehicle application.

Vehicles using platform (calendar years):
 Renault City K-ZE (2019–present)
 Dongfeng Aeolus EX1 (2019–present)
 Dongfeng Fengxing T1 (2019–present)
 Dongfeng Fengguang E1 (2019–present)
 Venucia e30 (2019–present)
 Dacia Spring Electric (2021–present)

CMF-A+ 
The CMF-A+ platform is a larger derivative of the CMF-A platform. The platform is mainly utilized for low-cost B-segment or subcompact vehicles for emerging markets.

Vehicles using platform (calendar years):
 Renault Triber (2019–present)
Renault Kiger (2021–present)
 Nissan Magnite — DD0 (2020–present)

CMF-B

CMF-B HS
The CMF-B HS (high specifications) platform underpins higher end vehicles in the B-segment/supermini or subcompact segment. The platform replaces the B platform and V platform.

Vehicles using platform (calendar years):
 Renault Clio V (2019–present)
 Renault Captur II (2019–present)
 Renault Arkana/Mégane Conquest/Renault Samsung XM3 (South Korean-built only, 2020–present)
 Nissan Juke — F16 (2019–present)
Nissan Note — E13 (2020–present)
 Note Aura (2021–present)
 Mitsubishi Colt (2023 announced)
 Mitsubishi ASX (2023 announced)

CMF-B LS
The CMF-B LS (low specifications) platform underpins budget models in the B-segment/supermini or subcompact segment. The platform replaces the B0 platform and M0 platform.

Dacia Logan III (2020–present)
 Dacia Sandero III (2020–present)
Renault Taliant (2021–present)
Dacia Jogger (2021–present)

CMF-B EV 
CMF-B EV (electric vehicle, also known as CMF-BEV or CMFB-EV) is the CMF-B platform variant that has been adapted for low-cost B-segment battery electric vehicles. It shares approximately  the components of the CMF-B platform. The CMF-B EV platform was designed to reduce production cost and increase vehicle efficiency compared to the B-segment Renault Zoe, which used a bespoke platform. Two types of traction batteries using  chemistry are expected: "high-performance" and "affordable" variants, with the goal of reducing battery cost below US$80/kW-hr by 2030.

Vehicles using platform (calendar years):
 Nissan Micra EV (2024 announced)
 Renault 4ever (2025 announced)
 Renault 5 EV (2024 announced)

CMF-C/D
The CMF-C/D platform underpins various vehicles in the C-segment and above. The platform replaces the C platform and D platform.

Vehicles using platform (calendar years):
 Renault Espace V (2015–2022)
 Renault Kadjar (2015–2023)
 Renault Talisman/Renault Samsung SM6 (2015–2023)
 Renault Mégane IV (2016–2022)
 Renault Koleos/Renault Samsung QM6 II (2016–present)
 Renault Scénic IV (2016–present)
Renault Austral (2022–present)
 Nissan Qashqai/Rogue Sport — J11 (2013–2022)
 Nissan X-Trail/Rogue — T32 (2013–2020)
 Nissan Pulsar/Tiida — C13 (2014–present)
 Nissan Sentra/Sylphy — B18 (2019–present)
 Nissan X-Trail/Rogue — T33 (2020–present)
 Nissan Qashqai — J12 (2021–present)
 Mitsubishi Outlander — GN (2021–present)
 Renault Kangoo III (2021–present)
 Kangoo E-Tech Electric (2021–present)
 Mercedes-Benz Citan/T-Class — (2021–present)
 Mercedes-Benz eCitan/EQT — (2021–present)
 Nissan Townstar — (2021–present)
 Townstar EV — (2021–present)

CMF-EV
The CMF-EV platform underpins battery electric vehicles. It replaces the EV platform used by the Nissan Leaf.

Vehicles using platform (calendar years):
 Nissan Ariya (2021–present)
 Renault Mégane E-Tech Electric (2021–present)

External links
 Official press release

References

CMF
CMF